Monroe Municipal Airport  is a city owned public use airport located three nautical miles (6 km) northeast of the central business district of Monroe, a city in Green County, Wisconsin, United States. It is included in the Federal Aviation Administration (FAA) National Plan of Integrated Airport Systems for 2021–2025, in which it is categorized as a local general aviation facility.

Although many U.S. airports use the same three-letter location identifier for the FAA and IATA, this facility is assigned EFT by the FAA but has no designation from the IATA.

Facilities and aircraft 
Monroe Municipal Airport covers an area of 257 acres (104 ha) at an elevation of 1,086 feet (331 m) above mean sea level. It has two runways with asphalt surfaces: 12/30 is 5,000 by 75 feet (1,524 x 23 m) and 2/20 is 3,000 by 75 feet (914 x 23 m).

For the 12-month period ending April 16, 2021, the airport had 17,300 aircraft operations, an average of 47 per day: 95% general aviation, 3% air taxi and 2% military. In January 2023, there were 42 aircraft based at this airport: 41 single-engine and 1 jet.

See also 
 List of airports in Wisconsin

References

External links 
  at Wisconsin DOT Airport Directory
 Aerial image as of February 2000 from USGS The National Map
 

Airports in Wisconsin
Buildings and structures in Green County, Wisconsin